The 2015 WNBA season was the 18th season for the San Antonio Stars of the WNBA. The Stars will play their home games at Freeman Coliseum due to renovation at AT&T Center.

Transactions

WNBA Draft

Trades

Roster

Season standings

Schedule
STARS: Stars Schedule 2015

Preseason

Playoffs

Statistics

Regular season

Awards and honors

References

External links
The official site of the San Antonio Stars

San Antonio Stars seasons
San Antonio